Niketas or Nicetas Choniates (c. 1155 – 1217), whose actual surname was Akominatos (Ἀκομινάτος), was a Roman (Byzantine) government official and historian – like his brother Michael Akominatos, whom he accompanied to Constantinople from their birthplace Chonae (from which came his nickname, "Choniates" meaning "person from Chonae"). Nicetas wrote a history of the Eastern Roman Empire from 1118 to 1207.

Life

Nicetas  Akominatos was born to wealthy parents around 1150 in Phrygia in the city of Chonae (near the modern Honaz in Turkey). Bishop Nicetas of Chonae baptized and named the infant; later he was called "Choniates" after his birthplace. When he was nine, his father dispatched him with his brother Michael to Constantinople to receive an education. Niketas' older brother greatly influenced him during the early stages of his life.

He initially secured a post in the civil service, and held important appointments under the Angelos emperors (among them that of Grand Logothete or Chancellor) and was governor of the theme of Philippopolis at a critical period. After the sack of Constantinople during the Fourth Crusade in 1204, he fled to Nicaea, where he settled at the court of the Nicaean emperor Theodore I Lascaris, and devoted himself to literature. He died c. 1215–16.

His theological work, Thesaurus Orthodoxae Fidei, although extant in a complete form in manuscripts, has been published only in part. It is one of the chief authorities for the heresies and heretical writers of the 12th century.

Choniates in fiction
Umberto Eco's novel Baudolino  is set partly at Constantinople during the Crusader conquest. The imaginary hero, Baudolino, saves Niketas during the sacking of Constantinople, and then proceeds to confide his life story to him.

Niketas is a major character in Alan Gordon's murder mystery A Death in the Venetian Quarter (New York: St. Martin's Minotaru, 2002).

Editions and translations
 Imperii Graeci Historia, ed. Hieronymus Wolf, 1557, in Greek with parallel Latin translation. (PDF of 1593 reprint)
 Nicetæ Choniatæ Historia, ed. J.P. Migne (Patrologia Graeca vol. 140) reproduces Wolf's text (in more modern type) and translation (in standardized spelling). (PDF)
 Nicetae Choniatae Historia, ed. Immanuel Bekker, Bonn (CSHB), 1835, with Wolf's translation at the bottom of the page. (at the Internet Archive)
 Nicetae Choniatae Historia, ed. Jan Louis van Dieten, Berlin (CFHB #11), 1975.
 O City of Byzantium: Annals of Niketas Choniates, trans. Harry J. Magoulias, 1984. (PDF)

References

Further reading
 
 Harris, Jonathan, Byzantium and the Crusades, Bloomsbury, 2nd ed., 2014. 
 Harris, Jonathan. 'Distortion, divine providence and genre in Nicetas Choniates' account of the collapse of Byzantium 1180–1204', Journal of Medieval History, vol. 26 (2000) 19–31.
 Simpson & Efthymiadis (edd.). Niketas Choniates: A Historian and a Writer, 2009, 
  A seminal work on Choniates' use of Homer.

External links
 Excerpt in English on the Sack of Constantinople in 1204.
 A longer excerpt on the same.
 

People from Colossae
1150s births
1210s deaths
13th-century Byzantine historians
Byzantine officials
Christian anti-Gnosticism
12th-century Byzantine historians
People of the Empire of Nicaea